PVB may refer to:
 Palos Verdes blue (Glaucopsyche lygdamus palosverdesensis), a butterfly
 Pemberton Volcanic Belt, a geologic feature in southwestern British Columbia, Canada
 Phong Vũ Buffalo, a professional eSports organization
 Polyvinyl butyral, a type of plastic
 Ponte Vedra Beach, Florida
 Present value of benefits, a term used in project appraisal
 Pressure vacuum breaker